Tian is a male given name of South African origin. Notable people with the name include:

Tian Meyer (born 1988), South African rugby union footballer
Tian Viljoen (born 1961), South African former tennis player

See also
Tian (surname), a common Chinese language surname

Masculine given names